Highly Suspect is an American rock band from Cape Cod, Massachusetts. The band consists of twin brothers Rich (bass, backing vocals) and Ryan Meyer (drums, backing vocals), Johnny Stevens (guitar, lead vocals), and Matt Kofos (guitar, synthesizer, backing vocals). After starting as a bar cover band, they relocated to Brooklyn, New York, where they recorded The Worst Humans EP with producer Joel Hamilton.

The band's first studio album, Mister Asylum, was released in 2015, earning Highly Suspect a nomination for Best Rock Album at the 58th Annual Grammy Awards. The song "Lydia" was also nominated for Best Rock Song. Their second studio album, The Boy Who Died Wolf, was released in 2016. Two singles have been released from the album, "My Name Is Human", which topped the Billboard US Mainstream Rock Songs chart, and "Little One", which peaked at number 2 on the same chart. Highly Suspect's third studio album, MCID, was released in 2019, and its fourth studio album, The Midnight Demon Club, came out in 2022.

History

Formation and Mister Asylum (2009–2015)
Highly Suspect got their start in 2009 as a cover band playing songs by Sublime, Jimi Hendrix and Pink Floyd in local bars in the Cape Cod area, such as the British Beer Company, J.R Brody's Roadside Tavern, and Sundancers, also touring and playing a limited number of shows with bands 10 Years, Monster Truck and Sevendust. They attended Dennis-Yarmouth Regional High School.

First Offense was Highly Suspect's first EP, released on July 15, 2009. The EP consists of "Life's a Fun Ride", "Not Me", and "Smile On", their first written and recorded songs after making the switch from a cover band ("Not Me" would later appear on the self-titled album Highly Suspect).

The Gang Lion EP was the band's second EP, released on October 3, 2010. It consists of "Gang Lion", "Big Bear", and "Then Mickey", all of which would later appear on their self-titled album, Highly Suspect.

The Worst Humans was the band's third EP, released July 13, 2012. The EP featured the songs "Bath Salts", "Gumshoe" and "The Go". The recordings were available for both physical purchase and digital download on Bandcamp.

The band's fourth EP, Black Ocean, was released in October 2013. It featured two tracks from their debut release as well as three new tracks, "Fuck Me Up", "Lydia", and "Guess What". This release was jointly produced by Joel Hamilton and Joe Duplantier of Gojira.

Their self-titled compilation album Highly Suspect was released in 2011. It contains fourteen tracks, consisting of several new songs as well as previously released but re-recorded songs, like "Gang Lion" and "Then Mickey".

The band toured the United States in early 2015 with Deftones, Chevelle, Halestorm, Catfish and the Bottlemen and Scott Weiland from Stone Temple Pilots. The music video for the song "Lydia" premiered on MTV.com on June 25, 2015.

Their first studio album Mister Asylum was released on July 17, 2015, via 300 Entertainment. The first single from the album, titled "Lydia", peaked at number 4 on the US Mainstream Rock Songs chart and at number 24 on the US Alternative Songs chart. On July 24, 2015, the album debuted at number 39 on the New Zealand Albums Chart.

Highly Suspect was selected for iTunes' 2015 New Artist Spotlight by its editors. In November, the band released their second single "Bloodfeather", which peaked at number 5 on the US Mainstream Rock Songs chart.

The Boy Who Died Wolf (2016–2017)

Their second studio album, The Boy Who Died Wolf, was released November 18, 2016. The band released the single "My Name Is Human" on September 7, 2016. A second single, "Little One", was released on April 26, 2017. On December 6, it was announced that "My Name Is Human" was nominated for Best Rock Song at the 59th Annual Grammy Awards.

MCID (2018–2021)

A single featuring Young Thug entitled "Tokyo Ghoul" and Stevens' hip-hop persona "Terrible Johnny" was released October 4, 2019. The fourth single, "Canals", was released on October 25, 2019. The album was released on November 1.

The Midnight Demon Club (2022-present)
The band's fourth full-length album The Midnight Demon Club came out in September 9, 2022, featuring singles as "Natural Born Killer", "Pink Lullabye" and others.

Musical style
Highly Suspect's musical style has been described as alternative rock, hard rock, blues rock, grunge, rock and roll, progressive rock, and garage rock. Their third studio album, MCID, marked a change in sound and utilized elements of hip hop, pop, and electropop.

Band members

 Johnny Stevens – lead vocals, guitar, synthesizer, piano (2009–present) 
 Ryan Meyer – drums, vocals (2009–present)
 Rich Meyer – bass, synthesizer, vocals (2009–present) 
 Matt Kofos – guitar, synthesizer, vocals (2019–present)
 Mark Schwartz - guitar, synthesizer, keyboards (2019–present)

Discography

Studio albums

Compilation albums
Highly Suspect (2011)

EPs
First Offense (2009)
The Gang Lion EP (2010)
The Worst Humans (2012)
Black Ocean (2013)

Singles

Music videos

Awards and nominations

Notes

References

Atlantic Records artists
Alternative rock groups from Massachusetts
American progressive rock groups
Musical groups established in 2009
American musical trios
2009 establishments in Massachusetts
Sibling musical groups